Cyrian Ravet (born 5 September 2002) is a French taekwondo athlete. He won the gold medal at the 2021 European Taekwondo Championships men's 58 kgs.

References

External links 

 

French male taekwondo practitioners
Living people
2002 births
European Taekwondo Championships medalists
Sportspeople from Lyon
21st-century French people